Balsan Station is a station on the Seoul Subway Line 5 in Gangseo-gu, Seoul.

Balsan station lies just east of Gimpo International Airport. The Han River is a 15-minute walk to the north. Businesses around the station include NC Department stores, and Lotteria. Also within walking distance to the east are Home Plus, E-Mart, and McDonald's.

Station layout

Vicinity
Exit 1: Magok-dong
Exit 2: Balsan Sageori(Junction)
Exit 3: NC Department Stores, Deungmyeong Elementary & Middle Schools
Exit 4: Gangseo Employment Office
Exit 5: Gangseo-gu Office
Exit 6: Ujangsan Hillstate APT
Exit 7: Gagok Elementary School
Exit 8: Balsan 1-dong
Exit 9: Gangseo driver's examination office

References 

Railway stations opened in 1996
Seoul Metropolitan Subway stations
Metro stations in Gangseo District, Seoul